Civil disorder, also known as civil disturbance, civil unrest, or social unrest is a situation arising from a mass act of civil disobedience (such as a demonstration, riot, strike, or unlawful assembly) in which law enforcement has difficulty maintaining their authority.

Engagement

According to the U.S. Code, a person is engaged in civil disorder if they -

Causes
Any number of things may cause civil disorder, whether it is a single cause or a combination of causes; however, most are born from political grievances, economic disparities, social discord, but historically have been the result of long-standing oppression by a group of people towards another.

Civil disorder arising from political grievances can include a range of events, from a simple protest to a mass civil disobedience.  These events can be spontaneous, but can also be planned. These events can turn violent when agitators and law enforcers overreact.

Civil disorder has in history arisen from economic disputes, political reasons (such as in opposition to oppressive or tyrannical government forces), religious opposition, racial oppression and social discord among various cases throughout history.

Crowd

Formation

Exploiting a crowd's mood, radicals can manipulate and weaponize a crowd, using skillful agitation to coax the crowd's capacity for violence and turn it into a vengeful mob, directing the crowd's aggression and resentment at the agitator's chosen target.

Tactical agitators can use media, and social media, to connect with potential crowd-members, and incite them to break the law, or to attempt to provoke others into doing so, without having any direct personal contact.  Conversely, a skilled leader person can also calm, or divert, a crowd using strategic suggestions or commands, or appealing to them with reason in order to deescalate a situation.

Emotional contagion greatly influences crowd behavior by providing the crowd a psychological sense of "unity."  This sense may provide the crowd with the momentum to absorb a mob mentality, and to take on mob behavior.  Crowd-members feed off of each other's excitement, which produces a high state of collective emotion. The ideas crowd leaders rapidly transmit throughout the group, and also to bystanders, rubberneckers, and mass media.

When emotional contagion prevails, raw emotion is high while self-discipline is low. Personal prejudices and unsatisfied desires – usually restrained – are unabashedly released.   This incentivizes crowd membership, as the crowd provides cover for individuals to do things they want to do, but would not dare try to do alone.  This incentive can become greater for the crowd than its concern for law and authority, leading to unlawful and disruptive acts.  Once the crowd engages in such acts, it effectively becomes a mob – a highly emotional, unreasonable, potentially violent crowd.

Behavior
  
Crowd behavior is the emotional needs, fears, and prejudices of the crowd members.  It is driven by social factors such as the strength, or weakness, of leadership, moral perspective, or community uniformity, and also by psychological factors of suggestion e.g. imitation, anonymity, impersonality, emotional release, emotional contagion, panic, etc.

During civil disorder, any crowd can be a threat to law enforcers because it is open to manipulation.  This is because the behavior of a crowd is under the direction of the majority of its members.  While its members are usually inclined to obey the law, emotional stimuli, and the feeling of fearlessness that arises from being in a crowd, can cause crowd members to indulge in impulses, act on aggressions, and unleash rage.  When law enforcement limits the full realization of these actions, the crowd will channel this hostility elsewhere, making the crowd a hostile and unpredictable threat to law enforcers.

Crowds want to be directed, and can become frustrated by confusion and uncertainty; therefore, leadership can have a profound influence on the intensity and conduct of a crowd's behavior.  The first person to authoritatively direct a crowd will likely be followed. Opportunity for radicals to take charge of a group to emerge when no authoritative voice emerges, and the crowd becomes frustrated without direction.

Panic, which is extremely and quickly contagious, also affects crowd behavior by influencing their ability to reason, lending to frantic, irrational behavior that cannot only endanger the crowd, but also others.  During civil disorder, panic can set in when a crowd member realizes –

 They are in danger and fleeing is necessary to escape arrest or harm
 Few escape routes exist
 The few escape routes are congested with traffic
 Their actions have caused harm to others
 When they have not dispersed the scene quickly enough, that their life, or freedom, is at risk from encroaching law enforcement agents

Tactics

A goal of violent demonstrators is to spur law enforcers to take action that can be exploited as acts of brutality in order to generate sympathy for their cause, and/or to anger and demoralize the opposition.  Crowds can use a range of tactics to evade law enforcement or to promote disorder, from verbal assault to distracting law enforcers to building barricades.  The more well-planned tactics occur, the more purposeful the disorder.  For example, crowds may form human blockades to shut down roads, they may trespass on government property, they may try to force mass arrests, they may handcuff themselves to things or to each other, or they may lock arms, making it more difficult to separate them, or they might create confusion or diversions through the use of rock throwing, arson, or terrorist acts, giving leeway to law enforcers to be forceful or excessive while trying to remove them.  Also, sometimes, terrorist elements.

Most participants of civil disorder engage on foot.  However, organized efforts, often implore the use vehicles and wireless communication.

Participants have been known to use scanners to monitor police frequencies, or transmitters to sabotage law enforcement communications.

If a crowd turns violent, effectively becoming a "mob," it may execute physical attacks on people and property, such as by throwing homemade weapons like molotov cocktails, firing small arms, and planting improvised explosive devices.  If the violence is not pre-arranged, a crowd may resort to throwing rocks, bricks, bottles, etc. If violence is pre-arranged, the crowd can hide their weapons, or vandalism tools, well before the crowd formation, catching law enforcement by surprise.

Crowds may arm themselves with:

 Gas masks
 Rocks
 Helmets
 Homemade shields
 Improvised picket signs
 Molotov cocktails
 Paint bombs
Pipes
 Safety goggles
 Wire cutters

A mob may erect barricades to impede, or prevent, the effectiveness of law enforcement.  For example, they may use grappling hooks, chains, rope, or vehicles, to breach gates or fences.  They may use sticks or poles to limit law enforcement's use of billy clubs and bayonets.  They may overturn civilian vehicles to impede troops advancing to engage them, or vandalize law enforcement vehicles to try to spark over-reaction from law enforcement, or to incite further lawlessness from the mob.

Mobs often implore the use of fire or hidden explosive devices e.g. strapped to animals, masked in cigarette lighters or toys, rigged to directed vehicles, etc.  Not only can they be used to create confusion or diversion, but they can also be used destroy property, and mask looting of mob participants, or provide cover for mob participants firing weapons at law enforcement.  If law enforcement engages with the mob, in returning fire, any innocent casualties resulting from the chaos usually make law enforcement look undisciplined and oppressive.

Law enforcement behavior

Like mob participants, law enforcers are also susceptible to crowd behavior.  Such tense confrontation can emotionally stimulate them, creating a highly emotional atmosphere all around.  This emotional stimulation can become infectious throughout law enforcement agents, conflicting with their disciplined training.

When emotional tension is high among law enforcement agents, they may breach their feeling of restraint and commit acts, against people in the mob, that they normally would suppress. The emotional atmosphere can also make them highly susceptible to rumors and fear.

Like mob members, law enforcement agents, acting as a group, can also lose their sense of individuality and develop a feeling of anonymity.  Under emotional instability, individual prejudices, that any individual law enforcement agent may harbor against the mob, or against individual participants of the mob, may influence the behavior of the law enforcement agent.  Like the mob, these conditions make law enforcement actors more likely to imitate the behavior of each other, which can result in a chain of biased, excessive, or otherwise, dangerous, behavior in which law enforcement agents act upon mob agents as impersonal threats and not as human beings.  Such action is heightened in which law enforcement agents are monolithic, across race and ethnicity, as law enforcement will become more susceptible to framing the disorder as a confrontation between "them" and "us."

Actions by law enforcement agents, motivated by emotion and prejudice, is often used as evidence against their ill will toward a crowd, or a mob, with their behavior only further  inflaming confrontation rather than reducing it.

Under such situations, law enforcement agents are rarely held accountable for all their actions against a crowd.

See also

Contentious politics
Civil disobedience
Direct action
Insurgency
List of riots
List of incidents of civil unrest in the United States
Martial law
Pogrom
Rebellion
Revolution
Sectarian violence

References

External links
 Revolution '67 Film website   - Documentary about the Newark, New Jersey race riots of 1967
 Brazil uprising points to rise of leaderless networks
 D.J. FitzGerald - text published by Elsevier Health Sciences 2006, 952 pages,